"Good Feeling" is a song by American rapper Flo Rida from his 2012 EP of the same name, also appearing on his fourth studio album, Wild Ones. It was released as the album's lead single on August 29, 2011, in the United States. The song was written by Flo Rida, Dr. Luke, Cirkut, Breyan Isaac, Arash Pournouri, Avicii, Etta James, Leroy Kirkland and Pearl Woods. It was also produced by Dr. Luke and Cirkut.

The song contains vocal samples from Etta James's 1962 single "Something's Got a Hold on Me", which is why James, Leroy Kirkland and Pearl Woods received writing credits. Avicii and Arash Pournouri received credits as well because Avicii's song "Levels", which also sampled the Etta James song, is used as the primary musical interpolation throughout "Good Feeling". In addition, this is Flo Rida's fourth collaboration with Dr. Luke (after "Right Round", "Touch Me" and "Who Dat Girl") and second collaboration with Cirkut (after "Who Dat Girl"). The three would next collaborate with Taio Cruz on the song "Hangover".

"Good Feeling" peaked at number 3 on the Billboard Hot 100, becoming Flo Rida's sixth top-ten and fourth top-five single on the chart. The song became a top ten hit in 16 countries.

Background and composition 

"Good Feeling" is the lead single from his album Wild Ones. The track was written by Flo Rida, Dr. Luke, Cirkut, Breyan Issac, Arash Pournouri, Avicii, Etta James, Leroy Kirkland and Pearl Woods, while production was helmed by Dr. Luke and Cirkut. Dr. Luke has previously produced Flo Rida's songs "Right Round", "Touch Me" and "Who Dat Girl"; Cirkut has previously teamed with Flo Rida on the latter song as well. "Good Feeling" is written in the key of D♭ minor and features acoustic-driven guitars, computerized beats and charging keyboards over a prominent sample from Avicii's song "Levels", which in turn samples Etta James's 1962 gospel-tinged hit "Something’s Got a Hold on Me".

The first use of the Etta James vocal sample in a popular track was by Pretty Lights in the song "Finally Moving" in 2006, with a remix surfacing in 2008.

Critical reception 

The song has received mixed to positive reviews from music critics. Trent Fitzgerald of "Pop Crush" gave the song four stars (out of possible five), writing that "the song is certainly destined to be a dance floor burner." The reviewer also said that "We have a good feeling that Flo Rida has a chart-topping hit on his hands with this club banger. It feels like an anthem for the fist-pumping crowd that idolizes MTV's Guido-ville show ‘The Jersey Shore.’" In a more favorable review, Katherine St Asaph of "Pop Dust" wrote that the track "might be the most listenable Flo Rida track ever" and that it's "pretty damn good."
In a more negative review, Digital Spy's Robert Copsey rated it two stars (out of possible five) and wrote that "the sampling of DJ Avicii's 'Levels' – which in turn samples Etta James's 'Something's Got a Hold on Me' – makes this club-rap number sound about as authentic as Asda's tinned spaghetti." Following James's death on January 20, 2012, Flo Rida dedicated the song in her memory.

Chart and sales performance 
"Good Feeling" debuted on the Billboard Hot 100 at No. 82 in its first week of release, and peaked at No. 3 in its 16th week on the Hot 100 in January 2012. It reached 3 million in sales by April 2012, and has sold over 4 million in the U.S. as of March 2014.

In the UK, "Good Feeling" reached No. 1 in the UK Singles Chart in January 2012 eight weeks after release. It became Flo Rida's fourth No. 1 in the UK with sales of 51,000 that week. The song has sold 1,200,000 copies in the UK as of December 2020.

Music video
A lyric video was uploaded to Flo Rida's YouTube channel on August 29, 2011. He shot the music video on September 27, 2011, and it was then later officially released to YouTube on October 21, 2011.

The music video for "Good Feeling" follows Flo Rida on a tour around Europe. A lot of his exercise regimen can be seen in detail. American rap artist Snoop Dogg can be seen in this video shaking hands with Flo Rida during a Marseilles show.

It also shows Flo Rida holding an Apple iPad in front of his face. He also rides a 'Tron Bike', created by Parker Brothers.

In popular culture

Media
The song was featured in an advert for British travel company First Choice in late 2011 promoting all inclusive holidays.
The song was used as a promotional song for the Australian television station Channel Ten for their revival of Young Talent Time, and was also used as a background for the title sequence and credits for the second series of BBC Three's Junior Doctors: Your Life in Their Hands. The song was used in a 2011 Express Holiday Collection commercial. A mashup with The Cult's "She Sells Sanctuary" was featured in Budweiser's "Eternal Optimism" ad that aired during Super Bowl XLVI. This song is used in Nickelodeon South East Asia's and Nickelodeon Philippines's commercial for the Good Friday special. The same sampling used in "Levels" by Avicii and "Die Young" by Kesha is used in the first trailer for Wreck-It Ralph and in the teaser trailer for its sequel, Ralph Breaks the Internet. The song is also featured in the video game Just Dance 4.

The song is also used in Buick and Royal Caribbean commercials. The song was used in the 2012 movie Diary of a Wimpy Kid: Dog Days.

The song is present in the pilot episode of iZombie.

It was also used in the official trailer for the 2017 comedy Father Figures.

Sports
For the 2011–12 and 2012–13 seasons, "Good Feeling" was the unofficial victory song of the National Hockey League (NHL)'s New York Rangers. The song was played after every Rangers home win at Madison Square Garden until it was replaced with "Wake Me Up", also by the song's producer, for the 2013–14 season. The song can also be heard in the second episode of HBO's 24/7, Road to the 2012 Winter Classic following a scene of the Rangers last second win against the Phoenix Coyotes on December 17, 2011.

“Good Feeling” was played to introduce the Super Bowl XLVI champion New York Giants during a celebration at the state's City Hall. Following this, each player received a key to New York City by Mayor Michael Bloomberg.

Flo Rida performed this song at the 2012 NBA All-Star Game on February 26.

The WWE used this song as the official theme song to WWE Survivor Series 2011 and it was one of two Flo Rida songs that were used as one of the official theme songs to WrestleMania XXVIII with the other being "Wild Ones". Flo Rida also performed "Good Feeling" along with "Wild Ones" live at WrestleMania XXVIII prior to The Rock entrance for his "Once In A Lifetime" match against John Cena.

The song was also used at Arthur Ashe Court during the 2012 US Open in Flushing, Queens, New York as a warm-up song.

The song was played at Oracle Arena after every Golden State Warriors home win until the Warriors' move to San Francisco in 2019 where it has continued to be played after every home win at Chase Center.

Track listing
CD single
"Good Feeling" – 4:06
"Good Feeling" (Jaywalker Remix) – 4:51

Digital download
"Good Feeling" – 4:06

Digital download — remixes
"Good Feeling" – 4:06
"Good Feeling" (Bingo Players Remix) – 5:33
"Good Feeling" (Hook N Sling Remix) – 6:15
"Good Feeling" (Carl Tricks Remix) – 5:40
"Good Feeling" (Sick Individuals Remix) – 6:18
"Good Feeling" (Jaywalker Remix) – 4:51
"Good Feeling" (J.O.B. Remix) – 5:50
"Good Feeling" (Seductive Remix) – 4:45

Charts

Weekly charts

Year-end charts

All-time charts

Certifications

Release history

See also
 List of number-one hits of 2011 (Austria)
 List of number-one hits of 2011 (Germany)
 List of number-one singles of 2012 (Ireland)
 List of UK Singles Chart number ones of 2012
 List of UK R&B Chart number-one singles of 2011
 List of UK R&B Chart number-one singles of 2012

References

2011 singles
2011 songs
Flo Rida songs
Song recordings produced by Cirkut (record producer)
Song recordings produced by Dr. Luke
Songs written by Dr. Luke
UK Singles Chart number-one singles
Irish Singles Chart number-one singles
Number-one singles in Austria
Number-one singles in Germany
Number-one singles in Scotland
Songs written by Breyan Isaac
Songs written by Arash Pournouri
New York Rangers
Golden State Warriors
Atlantic Records singles
Etta James
Songs written by Avicii